Mayurakshi is a 2017 Bengali film directed by Atanu Ghosh and produced by Firdausal Hassan & Probal Halder for Friends Communication. The music was composed by Debojyoti Mishra. The film won the award for Best Bengali feature film at the 65th National Film Awards.

Plot 
In the modern world, with work pressures and financial woes mounting, isolation and stress becoming an integral part of life, most people believe that father and son bonding is becoming a thing of the past.

Mayurakshi narrates an intensely emotional tale of an 84-year-old father Sushovan, a brilliant former professor of history, presently suffering from age related neurological problems including dementia and cognitive dysfunction. His middle-aged son Aryanil visits him, an intimately sensitive man going through an unsettling phase in his personal life. Though deeply attached to his father, Aryanil is settled in Chicago, USA, and as such cut off from the soul who shaped his life. Within a five-day span of reunion, lost chapters get curiously reopened and incidents long buried suddenly turn relevant. Few days become more eventful than years and through the process of confrontation with aging and destiny, Aryanil seeks hope and sustenance in his own life.

Cast 
 Soumitra Chatterjee as Sushovan
 Prosenjit Chatterjee as Aryanil
 Indrani Halder as Sahana
 Sudipta Chakraborty as Mallika
 Gargi Roychowdhury as Paromita

Awards and festivals 
 NATIONAL AWARD

Best Bengali Feature Film SINGAPORE SOUTH ASIAN INTERNATIONAL FILM FESTIVALBest Movie Award
Best Screenplay Award
 
 CHITRA BHARATHIBest Indian Cinema Award

 WBFJABest Film
Best Actor (Soumitra Chatterjee)
Best Actor (Prosenjit Chatterjee)

 FILMFARE' 
Best Film (Critics)
Best Actor - Critics (Soumitra Chatterjee)
Best Actor - Popular (Prosenjit Chatterjee)
Best Background Score (Debojyoti Mishra)

Hyderabad Bengali Film Festival

 See also 
 Angshumaner Chhobi Takhan Teish Rupkatha Noy Abby Sen''

References

External links
 

Films set in Kolkata
Indian drama films
Best Bengali Feature Film National Film Award winners
Films directed by Atanu Ghosh
Bengali-language Indian films
2010s Bengali-language films